Salka Aerodrome (also Nizhny Tagil Salka) is an aerodrome in Russia located 17 km northeast of Nizhny Tagil. Until 1994 the airfield was home to the 765th Fighter Aviation Regiment (765 IAP) initially operated the Sukhoi Su-9 (Fishpot) in the 1960s and 1970s. The regiment replaced it in 1980 with the MiG-23P (Flogger-G). From 1964-1994, the regiment was part of the 20th Air Defence Corps of the 4th Independent Air Defence Army. The 765 IAP was disbanded in 1994.

Currently the airfield used as experimental aerodrome operated by the Nizhny Tagil Institute of Metal Testing.

References

Soviet Air Defence Force bases
Nizhny Tagil
Military installations closed in 1994